Pál Budai (born 7 February 1925) was a Hungarian boxer. He competed in the men's welterweight event at the 1952 Summer Olympics.

References

External links
 

1925 births
Possibly living people
Hungarian male boxers
Olympic boxers of Hungary
Boxers at the 1952 Summer Olympics
Boxers from Budapest
Welterweight boxers